Sarah Harrison (born 1946) is an English novelist and children's writer. She has written successful novels and children's books, and also a writers' guide: How to Write a Blockbuster.

Family and life
Born in Exeter, Sarah Harrison is the second of three children of an army officer and a former actress, and a cousin of the novelist Celia Dale. The family spent time during her childhood in Berlin, Singapore, Malaya, then Germany again, before she was sent to boarding school at the age of nine. She took an English degree at the University of London and then worked for four years on the magazine Woman's Own, before becoming a freelance writer.

Harrison married for a second time in 2003. She has three grown-up children and six grandchildren. She is President of Morden and District Writers' Circle and a member of the Morden Players drama group, both based in Steeple Morden, Cambridgeshire, where she lives.

Writings

Novels
A Flower that's Free, 1984
Flowers of the Field, 1980
Hot Breath, 1985
An Imperfect Lady, 1988
Cold Feet, 1989
The Forests of the Night, 1991
Foreign Parts, 1992
Be an Angel, 1993
Both Your Houses, 1995
Life after Lunch, 1996
Flowers won't Fax, 1997
That Was Then, 1998
Heaven's on Hold, 1999
The Divided Heart, 2002
The Grass Memorial, 2002
A Dangerous Thing, 2002
The Dreaming Stones, 2003
Swan Music, 2005
The Next Room, 2005
The Nightingale's Nest, 2006
The Red Dress, 2006
A Spell of Swallows, 2007
The Hawk, ?
Rose Petal Soup, 2008
Matters Arising, 2009
Returning the Favour, 2010
Secrets of our Hearts, 2011
The Wildflower Path, 2013
All the Things, 2016
The Rose in Winter, 2017
Heart's Ease, 2019

Children's books
In Granny's Garden, 1980
Laura and Old Lumber, 1986
Laura and Edmund, 1986
Laura and the Squire, 1986
Laura and the Lady, 1986

Non-fiction
How to Write a Blockbuster, 1995

Other work
Contribution to the Sexy Shorts short story collection.

References

1946 births
Living people
English women novelists
English children's writers